Tomoplagia aberrans is a species of tephritid or fruit flies in the genus Tomoplagia of the family Tephritidae.

Distribution
Brazil.

References

Tephritinae
Insects described in 1954
Diptera of South America